The Singapore Community Shield (also known as the AIA Community Shield due to sponsorship reasons; formerly the Charity Shield) is the curtain-raiser to the football season in Singapore. The match is contested between the champions of the previous Singapore Premier League season and the Singapore Cup winners. In a situation when the same team wins both competition, then it is contested between the Singapore Premier League's champions and runners-up.

The Community Shield (known then as the Charity Shield) was first contested in 2008. In the inaugural match, the Singapore Armed Forces defeated Home United 5–4 on penalties following a 1–1 draw. The Shield first doubled up as the season's opening fixture in 2014 and remained so for all subsequent editions until 2018.

Great Eastern is the co-sponsor for the Community Shield since 2008 and becomes the main sponsor in 2017. Yeo's is the other co-sponsor for the Community Shield from 2008 until 2016.

On 23 February 2019, Football Association of Singapore (FAS) announced that AIA Singapore as the new title sponsor of the Singapore Premier League and Community Shield as part of a two-year agreement.

Past results

Performance by Clubs

See also

 Singapore Premier League
 Singapore Cup
 Singapore League Cup
 Football Association of Singapore
 List of football clubs in Singapore

References

External links
 Arch-rivals SAFFC and Home to clash for inaugural Singapore Charity Shield
 Warriors clinch inaugural Singapore Charity Shield
 Warriors FC 1 Balestier Khalsa 0: Velez strike clinches Charity Shield

Singapore
Football competitions in Singapore
2008 establishments in Singapore
Recurring sporting events established in 2008